Washington is a 2020 American television miniseries directed by Roel Reiné. The three-part miniseries, which premiered on February 16, 2020 on History, chronicles the life of George Washington, the first President of the United States.

Cast
Nicholas Rowe as George Washington
James Robinson as Alexander Hamilton
Nicholas Audsley as Thomas Jefferson
Nia Roberts as Martha Washington
Hainsley Lloyd Bennett as William 'Billy' Lee
Josh Taylor as Henry Knox
Ciarán Owens as Benedict Arnold
Dan Ursu as Jumonville
Shawn Beaver-Hawman as The Half-King
Radu Andrei Micu as Nathanael Greene
Daniel Crossley as James Madison
Frank Lammers as John Adams
Jeremy Berges as Marquis de Lafayette
Kieron Jecchinis as Horatio Gates
Colin Mace as General William Howe
James Carroll Jordan as General Charles Cornwallis

Episodes

See also
 George Washington (1984 miniseries)
 George Washington II: The Forging of a Nation (1986 miniseries)
 We Fight to Be Free (2006 film)
 Grant (2020 History Channel miniseries)
 Abraham Lincoln (2022 History Channel miniseries)
 Theodore Roosevelt (2022 History Channel miniseries)
 List of television series and miniseries about the American Revolution
 List of films about the American Revolution

References

External links

2020s American television miniseries
Films about George Washington
Cultural depictions of Alexander Hamilton
Cultural depictions of Benedict Arnold
Cultural depictions of James Madison
Cultural depictions of George Washington
Cultural depictions of Thomas Jefferson
Historical television series
Television series about the American Revolution
Television series based on actual events
Television series set in the 18th century
Television shows filmed in Romania
Cultural depictions of Martha Washington
Television series about presidents of the United States